Delfi Limited, formerly Petra Foods, is a Singaporean confectionery manufacturer.

History
Delfi Limited was established in 1984 by John Chuang and his brothers as Petra Foods Pte Ltd.. 

In 2012, Petra Foods entered into an agreement with Barry Callebaut where the latter would acquire the cocoa ingredient business of the former. The acquisition was completed in 2013.

In 2016, Petra Foods announced its intention to rename itself as Delfi Limited, after its main brand to mark a shift from focusing on cocoa ingredients to chocolate-based confectionery.

Products and brands
Prior to Delfi Limited's divestment of its cocoa ingredient division, it was known for providing cocoa ingredients to companies such as Cadbury, Mars, Meiji, and Nestlé. 

Among its products is Take It, a chocolate-coated wafer. Delfi has been involved in a legal dispute with Nestle in Singapore for Take It's similarity with the latter's KitKat. Delfi won the dispute in 2014.

In 2018, Delfi acquired the license for Van Houten chocolate brand.

It also owns Philippine brands Goya and Knick Knacks as well as Indonesian chocolate bar brand SilverQueen.

Operations in the Philippines
The operations in the Philippines is managed by Delfi Marketing Inc. and Delfi Foods, Inc. It manages local chocolate confectionery brand Goya which was previously owned by Philippine Cocoa. Philippine Cocoa was acquired by Nestlé in 1997 and Delfi (as Petra Foods) became involved with the Goya brand in 2006. Petra Foods would eventually bought Philippine Cocoa from Nestlé.
 Delfi also manufactures Knick-Knacks chocolate product in the Philippines. It operates a manufacturing plant in Marikina.

References

1984 establishments in Singapore
Confectionery companies